The 1979 CFL season is considered to be the 26th season in modern-day Canadian football, although it is officially the 22nd Canadian Football League season.

CFL News in 1979
The Edmonton Eskimos establishes a single season attendance record with 340,239 fans — the most by any Western Conference team.

Regular season standings

Final regular season standings
Note: GP = Games Played, W = Wins, L = Losses, T = Ties, PF = Points For, PA = Points Against, Pts = Points

Bold text means that they have clinched the playoffs.
Edmonton and Montreal have first round byes.

Grey Cup playoffs

The Edmonton Eskimos are the 1979 Grey Cup champions, defeating the Montreal Alouettes, 17–9, in front of their home crowd at Montreal's Olympic Stadium. This was Edmonton's second-straight championship. The Alouettes' David Green (RB) was named the Grey Cup's Most Valuable Player on Offence and Tom Cousineau (LB) was named the Grey Cup's Most Valuable Player on Defence, while Don Sweet (K) was named the Grey Cup's Most Valuable Canadian.

Playoff bracket

CFL Leaders
 CFL Passing Leaders
 CFL Rushing Leaders
 CFL Receiving Leaders

1979 CFL All-Stars

Offence
QB – Tom Wilkinson, Edmonton Eskimos
RB – David Green, Montreal Alouettes
RB – Larry Key, BC Lions
SB – Willie Armstead, Calgary Stampeders
TE – Tony Gabriel, Ottawa Rough Riders
WR – Waddell Smith, Edmonton Eskimos
WR – Brian Kelly, Edmonton Eskimos
C – Al Wilson, BC Lions
OG – Ray Watrin, Montreal Alouettes
OG – Larry Butler, Hamilton Tiger-Cats
OT – Mike Wilson, Edmonton Eskimos
OT – Lloyd Fairbanks, Calgary Stampeders

Defence
DT – Dave Fennell, Edmonton Eskimos
DT – John Helton, Winnipeg Blue Bombers
DE – Junior Ah You, Montreal Alouettes
DE – Reggie Lewis, Calgary Stampeders
LB – Danny Kepley, Edmonton Eskimos
LB – Ben Zambiasi, Hamilton Tiger-Cats
LB – Ron Foxx, Ottawa Rough Riders
DB – Dickie Harris, Montreal Alouettes
DB – Mike Nelms, Ottawa Rough Riders
DB – Gregg Butler, Edmonton Eskimos
DB – Ed Jones, Edmonton Eskimos
DB – Al Burleson, Calgary Stampeders

Special teams
P – Hank Ilesic, Edmonton Eskimos
K – Lui Passaglia, BC Lions

1979 Eastern All-Stars

Offence
QB – Tom Clements, Hamilton Tiger-Cats
RB – David Green, Montreal Alouettes
RB – Terry Metcalf, Toronto Argonauts
SB – Leif Pettersen, Hamilton Tiger-Cats
TE – Tony Gabriel, Ottawa Rough Riders
WR – Martin Cox, Ottawa Rough Riders
WR – Bob Gaddis, Montreal Alouettes
C – Doug Smith, Montreal Alouettes
OG – Ray Watrin, Montreal Alouettes
OG – Larry Butler, Hamilton Tiger-Cats
OT – Nick Bastaja, Toronto Argonauts
OT – Dan Yochum, Montreal Alouettes

Defence
DT – Glen Weir, Montreal Alouettes
DT – Mike Raines, Ottawa Rough Riders
DE – Junior Ah You, Montreal Alouettes
DE – Jim Corrigall, Toronto Argonauts
LB – Carl Crennell, Montreal Alouettes
LB – Ben Zambiasi, Hamilton Tiger-Cats
LB – Ron Foxx, Ottawa Rough Riders
DB – Dickie Harris, Montreal Alouettes
DB – Mike Nelms, Ottawa Rough Riders
DB – Jim Burrow, Montreal Alouettes
DB – Tony Proudfoot, Montreal Alouettes
DB – Billy Hardee, Toronto Argonauts

Special teams
P – Ian Sunter, Toronto Argonauts
K – Don Sweet, Montreal Alouettes

1979 Western All-Stars

Offence
QB – Tom Wilkinson, Edmonton Eskimos
RB – Jim Germany, Edmonton Eskimos
RB – Larry Key, BC Lions
SB – Willie Armstead, Calgary Stampeders
TE – Harry Holt, BC Lions
WR – Waddell Smith, Edmonton Eskimos
WR – Brian Kelly, Edmonton Eskimos
C – Al Wilson, BC Lions
OG – Bill Stevenson, Edmonton Eskimos
OG – Eric Upton, Edmonton Eskimos
OT – Mike Wilson, Edmonton Eskimos
OT – Lloyd Fairbanks, Calgary Stampeders

Defence
DT – Dave Fennell, Edmonton Eskimos
DT – John Helton, Winnipeg Blue Bombers
DE – David Boone, Edmonton Eskimos
DE – Reggie Lewis, Calgary Stampeders
LB – Danny Kepley, Edmonton Eskimos
LB – Glen Jackson, BC Lions
LB – Tom Towns, Edmonton Eskimos
DB – Terry Irvin, Calgary Stampeders
DB – Ray Odums, Calgary Stampeders
DB – Gregg Butler, Edmonton Eskimos
DB – Ed Jones, Edmonton Eskimos
DB – Al Burleson, Calgary Stampeders

Special teams
P – Hank Ilesic, Edmonton Eskimos
K – Lui Passaglia, BC Lions

1979 CFL Awards
CFL's Most Outstanding Player Award – David Green (RB), Montreal Alouettes
CFL's Most Outstanding Canadian Award – Dave "Dr. Death" Fennell (DT), Edmonton Eskimos
CFL's Most Outstanding Defensive Player Award – Ben Zambiasi (LB), Hamilton Tiger-Cats
CFL's Most Outstanding Offensive Lineman Award – Mike Wilson (OT), Edmonton Eskimos
CFL's Most Outstanding Rookie Award – Brian Kelly (WR), Edmonton Eskimos
CFLPA's Outstanding Community Service Award – John Helton (DT), Winnipeg Blue Bombers
CFL's Coach of the Year – Hugh Campbell, Edmonton Eskimos

References 

CFL
Canadian Football League seasons